147P/Kushida–Muramatsu is a quasi-Hilda comet discovered in 1993 by Japanese astronomers Yoshio Kushida and Osamu Muramatsu.

According to calculations made by Katsuhiko Ohtsuka of the Tokyo Meteor Network and David Asher of Armagh Observatory, Kushida–Muramatsu was temporarily captured by Jupiter as an irregular moon between May 14, 1949, and July 15, 1962, ( years).  It is the fifth such object known to have been captured.

It is thought that quasi-Hilda comets may be escaped Hilda asteroids. Comet Shoemaker–Levy 9, which collided with Jupiter in 1994, is a more famous example of a quasi-Hilda comet.

References

External links
 Orbital simulation from JPL (Java) / Horizons Ephemeris
 147P/Kushida-Muramatsu – Seiichi Yoshida @ aerith.net
 147P/Kushida-Muramatsu

Periodic comets
Encke-type comets
0147
Hilda asteroids
Jupiter
Comets in 2016
19931210